Half Past Autumn Suite is an album by jazz trumpeter Irvin Mayfield that was released in 2003 as a tribute to Gordon Parks, a photographer and pianist.

In 2000, Parks's photographs were given an exhibit at the New Orleans Museum of Art. The CD version of the album contained a CD-ROM with photos from the exhibition that could be downloaded, two videos of recording sessions, and an interview with Parks.

Parks and Mayfield performed a duet on "Wind Song". Wynton Marsalis played trumpet on the song "Blue Dawn". His brother, Delfeayo, produced the album and made a guest appearance on trombone.

Track listing

Personnel
 Irvin Mayfield – trumpet
 Gordon Parks – piano
 Wynton Marsalis – trumpet
 Delfeayo Marsalis – trombone, producer
 Aaron Fletcher – alto saxophone, soprano saxophone
 Marcus Strickland – tenor saxophone
 Edwin Livingston – double bass
 Jaz Sawyer – drums
 Richard Johnson – piano
 Mark Samuels – executive producer
 William Samuels – associate producer
 Steve Reynolds – engineer
 Todd Parker – engineer
 Jalmus – mixing

References

2001 albums
Irvin Mayfield albums
Mainstream jazz albums